Lampalizumab (INN) is an antigen-binding fragment of a humanized monoclonal antibody that binds to complement factor D; it was developed as a potential treatment of geographic atrophy (atrophy of the retinal cells, retinal pigment epithelium, and choriocapillaris) secondary to age-related macular degeneration.

One of the two Phase 3 clinical trials (Spectri) was interrupted on September 8, 2017 due to failure to meet primary end point. The second Phase 3 clinical trial (Chroma) also failed to meet its primary end point.

These two failures have called into question whether complement inhibition is a sound strategy for geographic atrophy.

References 

Monoclonal antibodies
Abandoned drugs